Trouble in Town may refer to:

 "Trouble in Town" (Coldplay song), a song by Coldplay off the album Everyday Life
 "Trouble in Town" (East Bay Ray song), a song by East Bay Ray
 Trouble in Town (East Bay Ray record), a 7" record by East Bay Ray published by Alternative Tentacles; see Alternative Tentacles discography
 JumpStart 3D Virtual World: Trouble in Town, an educational videogame
 "Trouble in Town" (TV episode), a 1953 episode of The Lone Ranger; see List of The Lone Ranger episodes
 "The Trouble in Town" (TV episode), an epiosde of Shiva (TV series)

See also

 Trouble Town
 Trouble (disambiguation)
 Town (disambiguation)